The men's 60 metres event  at the 1993 IAAF World Indoor Championships was held on 12 March.

Medalists

Results

Heats
First 2 of each heat (Q) and next 4 fastest (q) qualified for the semifinals.

Semifinals
First 4 of each semifinal (Q) qualified directly for the final.

Final

References

60
60 metres at the World Athletics Indoor Championships